Solhan District is a district of Bingöl Province in Turkey. The town of Solhan is the seat and the district had a population of 33,973 in 2021.

The district was established in 1932.

Composition 
Beside the town of Solhan, the district encompasses the municipality of Arakonak, twenty-seven villages and eighty hamlets.

Villages 

 Arslanbeyli
 Asmakaya
 Bozkanat
 Demirkapı
 Dilektepe
 Doğuyeli
 Düzağaç
 Elbaşı
 Elmasırtı
 Eşmetaş
 Gelintepe
 Gençtavuş
 Göksu
 Hazarşah
 İnandık
 Kaleköy
 Kırık
 Muratköy
 Mutluca
 Oymapınar
 Sükyan
 Sülünkaş
 Şimşirpınar
 Tarhan
 Yenibaşak
 Yenidal
 Yiğitharmanı

References 

Districts of Bingöl Province
Solhan District